Tuccio Musumeci (born 20 April 1934) is an Italian actor and comedian.

Life and career 
Born in Catania, Musumeci started his career in the 1960s, performing in local cabarets and avanspettacolo companies.

The turning point in his career was entering the stage company of the Teatro Stabile di Catania with whom he began acting in plays, mostly comedies, both in Italian and in Sicilian.

Musumeci intensively worked for television (beginning in 1959) and in the theater. Less active on films, after a bit part in The Leopard, he appeared in a good number of comedy films between the 1970s and 1980s, sometimes in leading roles.

Selected filmography 
 La ragazza del prete (1970)
 Holy Water Joe (1971)
 The Seduction of Mimi (1972)
 Il lumacone (1974)
 Virility (1974)
 L'adolescente (1976)
 La gatta da pelare (1981) 
 Open Doors (1990)
 La matassa (2009)
 Italo (2014)

References

External links 

1934 births
Actors from Catania
Italian male stage actors
Italian male film actors
Italian male television actors
Living people